The men's 125 kg freestyle wrestling competitions at the 2014 Commonwealth Games in Glasgow, Scotland was held on 29 July at the Scottish Exhibition and Conference Centre.

Results

Bracket

Repechage

References

Wrestling at the 2014 Commonwealth Games